The following highways are numbered 249:

Canada
 Prince Edward Island Route 249
 Quebec Route 249

Costa Rica
 National Route 249

Japan
 Japan National Route 249

United States
 Alabama State Route 249
 California State Route 249
 Florida State Road 249
 Georgia State Route 249 (former)
 Indiana State Road 249
 Iowa Highway 249 (former)
 K-249 (Kansas highway)
 Kentucky Route 249
 Maryland Route 249
 Minnesota State Highway 249 (former)
 Missouri Route 249
 Montana Secondary Highway 249
 New Mexico State Road 249
 New York State Route 249
 Ohio State Route 249
 Pennsylvania Route 249
 South Dakota Highway 249
 Tennessee State Route 249
 Texas State Highway 249
 Farm to Market Road 249 (Texas)
 Utah State Route 249 (former)
 Virginia State Route 249